A sporangiole is a specialised spherical sporangium produced by some species of fungi, smaller than or secondary to the typical sporangium.

References 
Fungal morphology and anatomy